Heinrich XIX, Prince Reuss of Greiz (1 March 179031 October 1836) was Prince Reuss of Greiz from 1817 to 1836.

Early life
Heinrich XIX was born at Offenbach, Grand Duchy of Hesse, elder surviving son of Heinrich XIII, Prince Reuss of Greiz (1747–1817), (son of Heinrich XI, Prince Reuss of Greiz and Countess Conradine Reuss of Köstritz) and his wife, Princess Wilhelmine Louise of Nassau-Weilburg (1765–1837), (daughter of Charles Christian, Prince of Nassau-Weilburg and Princess Carolina of Orange-Nassau).

Prince Reuss of Greiz
At the death of his father on 29 January 1817, he succeeded as the Prince Reuss of Greiz.

In 1819 he restored the Unteres Schloss (Lower Castle), where his father had already transferred the family residence.

Marriage
Heinrich XIX married on 7 January 1822 in Prague to Princess Gasparine of Rohan-Rochefort (1798–1871), third daughter of Charles Louis Gaspard of Rohan-Rochefort, and his wife, Marie Louise Joséphine of Rohan-Guéméné.

They had two daughters:
Princess Louise Caroline Reuss of Greiz (3 December 1822 – 28 May 1875), married firstly in 1842 to Prince Eduard of Saxe-Altenburg, but died in 1852, had issue; Married secondly in 1854 to Prince Heinrich IV Reuss of Köstritz, had issue.
Princess Elisabeth Reuss of Greiz (23 March 1824 – 7 May 1861), married in 1844 to Charles Egon III, Prince of Fürstenberg, had issue.

Death

At his death in 1836, having no male heir, the Head of the House Reuss of Greiz passed to his younger brother Heinrich XX.

Ancestry

Notes

References and sources
L'Allemagne dynastique, Huberty, Giraud, Magdelaine, Reference: I 333
Gehrlein Thomas, The House of Reuss - Older and Younger line Börde Verlag 2006, 

1790 births
1836 deaths
People from Offenbach am Main
Princes of Reuss